Koppom is a locality situated in Eda Municipality, Värmland County, Sweden with 643 inhabitants in 2010.

Notable people
Per Eklund, rally driver.
Solveig Ternström, actress.
Mona Brorsson, olympic gold medal winner, biathlon.

Sports 
On the local football field the team Koppoms IK are playing.

References 

Populated places in Värmland County
Populated places in Eda Municipality